Beginning in 1979, the Southern Baptist Convention (SBC) experienced an intense struggle for control of the organization. Its initiators called it the conservative resurgence while its detractors labeled it the fundamentalist takeover. It was launched with the charge that the seminaries and denominational agencies were dominated by liberals. The movement was primarily aimed at reorienting the denomination away from a liberal trajectory.

It was achieved by the systematic election, beginning in 1979, of conservative individuals to lead the Southern Baptist Convention. Theologically moderate and liberal leaders were voted out of office. Though some senior employees were fired from their jobs, most were replaced through attrition. Conversely, moderate and liberal presidents, professors,  and department heads of Southern Baptist seminaries, mission groups and other convention-owned institutions were replaced with conservatives.

The resurgence is said by some to be the most serious controversy ever to occur within the Southern Baptist Convention, the largest Protestant denomination in the United States. Albert Mohler later described it as a "reformation ... achieved at an incredibly high cost." A part of that cost was the departure of 1,900 churches from the convention, which broke away in 1990 to form the Cooperative Baptist Fellowship, a moderate Baptist group which affirms women in ordained ministry, and emphasizes the Baptist principles of the autonomy of the local church, the priesthood of all believers, and soul liberty.

Earlier 20th-century controversies
Throughout the 20th century, controversy had flared up sporadically among Southern Baptists over the nature of biblical authority and how to interpret the Bible.  Until 1925 the SBC did not have a specific, formal confession of faith; whenever an issue arose it had looked to two earlier and more general baptistic confessions of faith produced in the United States: the Philadelphia Confession of Faith (1742) and the New Hampshire Baptist Confession of Faith of 1833.

This would change when in the 1920s, Baptist pastor J. Frank Norris, described as "one of the most controversial and flamboyant figures in the history of fundamentalism", led a campaign upon the SBC (from which he would later depart), particularly against Southwestern Baptist Theological Seminary in Fort Worth and Baylor University in Waco, Texas. In response, the SBC adopted its first formal confession of faith, the Baptist Faith and Message.

Background
 The unity of the SBC had historically been functional rather than doctrinal. The founders wrote: "We have constructed for our basis no new creed; acting in this matter upon a Baptist aversion for all creeds but the Bible".

Some have tried to argue that Baptists have always avoided creeds. In fact, doctrinal statements have been a part of Baptist life at least since the seventeenth century.  The early SBC saw no need for such a statement since most of its member churches affirmed either the New Hampshire Confession of Faith or the Philadelphia Confession.  By the 1920s, with the rise of liberalism and neo-orthodoxy in other denominations, Southern Baptists saw the need to define their beliefs in a formal doctrinal statement. Thus, they adopted the 1925 Baptist Faith and Message.  By the 1970s, many conservatives in the SBC felt certain seminary professors had drifted from basic Baptist doctrines.  In a formal statement, they declared their commitment to "doctrinal unity in functional diversity", placing an emphasis on biblical authority. Conservatives argued that their beliefs did indeed represent a consensus among Southern Baptists. These individuals felt that while early Southern Baptists agreed on basic theological issues, by the 1970s many of these beliefs had come under attack in schools owned and operated by the Southern Baptist Convention.

The "Genesis" controversy 
In July 1961, Prof. Ralph Elliott, an Old Testament scholar at Midwestern Baptist Theological Seminary in Kansas City, published a book entitled The Message of Genesis containing his interpretation of the first book of the Bible. Elliott considered his book a "very moderate" volume, though this is vastly disputed. Some prominent Southern Baptists, however, saw the book in a different light and took issue with Elliot's use of historical-critical methodology, his portrayal of Genesis 1-11 as mythological literature and his speculation that Melchizedek was a priest of Baal and not, as generally believed by conservatives, of Yahweh.

The "Genesis Controversy" quickly pervaded the entire SBC. In strong reaction to the controversy, the 1962 SBC meeting elected as its president Rev. K. Owen White, pastor of First Baptist Church Houston, who had written a prominent criticism of Elliott's views. This began what has become an ongoing trend for SBC presidents to be elected on the basis of their theology. Broadman Press, the publishing arm of the Baptist Sunday School Board (now LifeWay Christian Resources) in Nashville, was immediately criticized and their other materials, including Sunday School quarterlies, became suspect. Elliott's book was withdrawn from publication, and he was later dismissed from Midwestern for insubordination.

1963 Baptist Faith and Message revision 
In 1963, the SBC adopted the first-ever revision of the Baptist Faith and Message, amending it to include confessional positions more conservative than contained in the original. However, it was not without its critics: one of the architects of the conservative resurgence described it as "having been infected with neo-orthodox theology."

Broadman Bible Commentary 
Also in the 1960s, the Sunday School Board, in its most ambitious publishing project, produced the 12-volume Broadman Bible Commentary. Its first volume, covering Genesis and Exodus, came out in 1969. In addition to providing further fuel for the controversy surrounding the Creation account in Genesis, a section written by G. Henton Davies, a Welsh Baptist, questioned the reliability of the biblical episode in which God commands Abraham to sacrifice his son, Isaac, on the grounds that such an event was morally troubling. This new publication immediately stirred a new phase of the ongoing controversy. Some argued that the Convention was trying to stifle dissent. Others pointed out that since Broadman Press was owned by the SBC, its publications should not stray so far from the beliefs of most Southern Baptists.

Seminary issues 
Conservative Southern Baptists of this time also bemoaned what they claimed was the growing presence of liberal ideology within the SBC's own seminaries.

Clark H. Pinnock, who later became an advocate of open theism, taught at the New Orleans Baptist Theological Seminary in the late 1960s and early 1970s. Pinnock is said to have been much more conservative in those days, at which time he argued that liberal professors should be dismissed. He did not embrace more liberal views until later. Ironically, he was a great influence on future conservative leaders, including Paige Patterson.

In 1976, a Southern Baptist Theological Seminary (SBTS) master's degree student, Noel Wesley Hollyfield, Jr., presented survey results that revealed an inverse correlation between length of attendance at SBTS and Christian orthodoxy. While 87% of first year Master of Divinity students at SBTS reporting believing "Jesus is the Divine Son of God and I have no doubts about it, " only 63% of final year graduate students made that claim, according to Hollyfield's analysis. In 1981, redacted information from Hollyfield's thesis was put into tract form and distributed by conservatives as evidence of the need for reform from apostasy within SBC agencies.

A hostile meeting 
The 1970 SBC meeting in Denver, Colorado, under the leadership of then-President W. A. Criswell, was marked by hostilities. Controversy erupted over a number of explosive issues. At least seventeen Baptist state papers questioned editorially the "unchristian, " "bitter, " "vitriolic, " "arrogant, " "militant" spirit and attitude of some of the messengers.

The messengers refused to hear an explanation about the Broadman Bible Commentary from the head of the Sunday School Board. Messengers actually booed ("hooted and hollered at...") Herschel H. Hobbs, the respected elder statesman and former president of the SBC, when he urged restraint.

The abortion issue 
At the 1971 Annual Meeting in St. Louis, almost two years before Roe v. Wade was decided, the messengers passed the SBC's first ever resolution on the topic of abortion. The resolution was by no means conservative: in addition to supporting abortion in cases of rape or incest—a position supported by some conservatives—it also supported it in such cases as "clear evidence of severe fetal deformity, and carefully ascertained evidence of the likelihood of damage to the emotional, mental, and physical health of the mother".

The messengers at the 1974 meeting in Dallas (the year after Roe was decided) reaffirmed the 1971 resolution, saying that it "dealt responsibly from a Christian perspective with complexities of abortion problems in contemporary society" while also in the same resolution saying that the SBC "historically held a high view of the sanctity of human life".

The conservative strategy
In the early 1970s, William Powell, at the time an SBC employee, developed a rather simple strategy to take control of the SBC: elect the SBC president for ten consecutive years.

Under the SBC bylaws, the SBC President has sole authority to appoint the entirety of the Committee on Committees (known during most of the controversy as the Committee on Boards); the appointments do not require approval of the Messengers at an Annual Meeting. This committee, in turn, nominates the members of the Committee on Nominations to be approved by the Messengers at the next Annual Meeting (i.e. one year after the SBC President is elected and he appoints the Committee on Committees), which in turn nominates appointees for vacant positions  to be approved by the Messengers at the subsequent Annual Meeting (i.e., two years from the initial Committee on Committees appointments, and one year after the Committee on Nominations makes its recommendations). The process involves numerous overlaps: at an Annual Meeting the Messengers approve (or reject) the nominees for positions recommended by the Committee on Nominations (the process of which started two years prior), approve nominations for the upcoming Committee on Nominations recommended by the Committee on Committees (which took place the prior year), and further elect the SBC President who will appoint the new Committee on Committees.

Therefore, if conservatives could gain the presidency, the President would nominate conservatives to the Committee on Committees, who would in turn nominate other conservatives to the Committee on Nominations, and then in turn fill the various vacancies with conservatives.  If they could gain and hold the presidency for ten years, they would accomplish the goal of having all agency heads be conservatives.

Takeover chronology
1967. Paul Pressler, a former state representative and a judge in Houston, Texas, and Paige Patterson, then president of Criswell College in Dallas, met in New Orleans to plan the successful political strategy to elect like-minded conservative convention presidents and in turn members of SBC boards.

1978. W. A. Criswell and Adrian Rogers (both now deceased), along with Paul Pressler and Paige Patterson, met with a group of determined pastors and laymen at a hotel near the Atlanta airport to launch the resurgence. They understood William Powell's contention that electing the president of the Southern Baptist Convention was the key to redirecting the entirety of the denomination. The Atlanta group determined to elect Rogers, pastor of Bellevue Baptist Church in Memphis, Tennessee, as the first Conservative Resurgence president of the convention.

1979 Houston convention. The 1979 SBC meeting in Houston, Texas, produced two important developments:

 The concept of Inerrancy. Southern Baptists applied a new word, "inerrancy", to their understanding of Scripture. Since 1650 the adjective most used by Baptists to describe their view of the Bible had been "infallible"; however, the term "inerrancy" had been implied in the 1833 New Hampshire Baptist Confession of Faith ("truth without any mixture of error") in wording that, by this time, had already been incorporated into the 1925 and 1963 editions of the Baptist Faith and Message. The word "inerrancy" was also used by the prominent Southern Baptist scholar A. T. Robertson in the late nineteenth century. Some reformed theologians in Europe had utilized the term "inerrancy" in the same way that North American theologians used "infallibility." Many conservative leaders championed the word "inerrancy" in this phase of the ongoing controversy—a phase that would later become known as the "inerrancy controversy."
 Orchestration from the sky boxes. Also coming out of the 1979 Houston Convention was a well-organized political campaign, using precinct style politics, to wrest control of the SBC. Such tactics were not completely unprecedented; Jimmy Allen had openly campaigned for the office just two years earlier. Pressler and Patterson were accused of directing the affairs of the 1979 meeting from sky boxes high above The Summit where the SBC was meeting. Pressler said such accusations were false. The election on the first ballot of the more conservative pastor Adrian Rogers began the ten-year process. Ever since that meeting, with the exception of 2004 and 2005 the conservatives of the denomination have nominated their choice for president. Each has appointed more conservative individuals, who in turn appointed others, who nominated the trustees, who elected the agency heads and institutional presidents, including those of the seminaries. Throughout the 1980s, Conservative Resurgence advocates gained control over the SBC leadership at every level from the administration to key faculty at their seminaries and slowly turned the SBC towards more conservative positions on many social issues. By early 1989 nearly every one of the SBC boards had a majority of takeover people on it. The book entitled The Fundamentalist Takeover in the Southern Baptist Convention cites the following as further key events in the resurgence:

1980: At the Annual Meeting in St. Louis, the messengers completely reversed their original position on abortion (which was passed nine years earlier, ironically also in St. Louis).  This time they passed a resolution condemning the practice, making an exception only to save the life of the mother.  Since then, every SBC resolution on the topic has been in strong opposition to reproductive rights, and has expanded into similar topics such as fetal tissue experimentation, RU-486, and taxpayer funding of abortions generally and Planned Parenthood specifically.

1981: Cecil Sherman, a leader of the moderate faction of Southern Baptists declared in a debate with Paige Patterson, that he did not believe in an inerrant Bible but in "...a ‘dynamical’ view of the Bible's inspiration and then pointed to what he saw as contradictions in the biblical text.

1984: The SBC voted in Kansas City to adopt a strongly worded resolution against women in the pastorate. The rationale cited was that "the New Testament emphasizes the equal dignity of men and women (Gal. 3:28)" but that "The Scriptures teach that women are not in public worship to assume a role of authority over men lest confusion reign in the local church (1 Cor. 14:33-36)".

1987: W. Randall Lolley, the president of Southeastern Baptist Theological Seminary in Wake Forest, North Carolina, resigned after the trustees voted to hire only faculty members who follow the Baptist Faith and Message.

1987: The SBC voted in St. Louis to adopt a report from "The Peace Committee" that had been set up in 1985. The report identified the roots of the controversy as primarily theological, and called on Baptist seminaries to teach in accordance with the Bible.

1988: At the SBC Convention in San Antonio, a resolution was passed critical of the liberal interpretation of the "priesthood of the believer" and "soul competency." Moderates and liberals accused conservatives of elevating the pastor to the position of authority in the church he serves.

1990: Roy Honeycutt, president of the Southern Baptist Theological Seminary in Louisville, Kentucky, was accused by a new trustee of "not believing the Bible." The trustee cited some of Honeycutt's own writings as evidence. This same trustee would later become chairman of the seminary board shortly after resurgency leader Al Mohler became president in 1993.<ref>"Baptist Briefs 12/22/2003." (Texas) Baptist Standard." Web:</ref>1990: Al Shackleford and Dan Martin of the Baptist Press, the official news service of the SBC, were fired by the SBC's Executive Committee. The Executive Committee gave no reason for their firing; moderates claimed that they were fired for perceived bias against conservatives in their news coverage.1990: After the SBC had elected twelve straight conservative convention presidents, who then used their position to appoint conservative educators and administrators, a group of moderates broke away in 1990 to form the Cooperative Baptist Fellowship (CBF).  Due in part to the perception that Shackleford and Martin were fired for bias against conservative leadership, the CBF formed the Associated Baptist Press (now Baptist News Global) to offer news from the moderate perspective.1991: At their October meeting, the Foreign Mission Board trustees voted to defund the Baptist Theological Seminary in Rüschlikon, Switzerland.1992: Keith Parks, president of the Foreign Mission Board, retired. In his thirteen years as president, missionaries entered forty new countries with a total of 3,918 missionaries.1991: Lloyd Elder, president of the Sunday School Board, resigned under pressure and was replaced by former SBC president James T. Draper, a staunch conservative. A total of 159 employees retired (voluntarily or involuntarily) in November 1991.1993: Al Mohler was appointed president of Southern Baptist Theological Seminary in 1993 and "hailed as a hero of SBC fundamentalism."1994: Russell Dilday, president of Southwestern Baptist Theological Seminary in Fort Worth for fifteen years, was fired abruptly and trustees changed the locks on the president's office immediately, thus denying him access. The day before, these same trustees gave Dilday a favorable job performance evaluation. These trustees sent letters to pastors and directors of missions to explain their reason for firing Dilday, saying he failed to support the resurgence at the convention and that he held liberal views of the scripture. The Seminary faculty disputed these charges. In a March 22 statement, the seminary's theology faculty claimed that Dilday was an "excellent administrator" who led Southwestern in a "highly effective and successful manner" and "with a spirit of Christlikeness." Dilday, the statement said, also kept the school doctrinally sound.  1997: In October a forty-year staff member was fired at the Southern Baptist Theological Seminary for writing a private letter to the President of the SBC disagreeing with a statement he had made while speaking in chapel.  Also in October 1997, a professor of systematic theology at Southwestern Baptist Theological Seminary was relieved of his teaching duties because he "voiced dissent about actions of the administration of the institution."1998: In June, Paige Patterson was elected president of the SBC without opposition. Jerry Falwell, who had criticized Southern Baptists in the days of moderate-liberal rule, attended his first SBC Convention as a messenger along with others from his church in Lynchburg, Virginia. Also the SBC amended the Baptist Faith and Message by adding a new Article XVIII ("The Family") to the Message; it included a complementarian statement about male-priority gender roles in marriage, including an adverbial modifier to the verb "submit": a wife is to "submit herself graciously to the servant leadership of her husband", followed by a lengthy description of a husband's duty to "love his wife unconditionally."2000: The SBC adopted a revised Baptist Faith and Message, which (for the first time) included statements opposing homosexuality and abortion.2002: Jerry Rankin and the IMB trustees began requiring missionaries to sign their assent to the 2000 Baptist Faith and Message. Many missionaries resigned, and the requirement was said to "undermine missionary morale."2004: The Southern Baptist Convention withdrew as a member of the Baptist World Alliance (BWA).

Liberal and moderate reactions

 Liberal reaction 

A relatively small group of openly liberal congregations split away in 1987 to form the Alliance of Baptists. With more than 2,000 individual members in 2010, 32 domestic and international mission partners, and 130 affiliate congregations the Alliance is an organization of Baptists promoting what they call progressive theologies, radical inclusivity, justice-seeking, ecumenism, and mission partnerships around the world.

The Alliance joined the National Council of the Churches of Christ (NCC) in 2000. The NCC is an umbrella group of mainline Christian denominations. The Alliance formed a partnership with the United Church of Christ (UCC) in 2002. Since 1995 and continuing, the Alliance "...essentially declared (themselves) a welcoming and affirming group as to sexual orientation." In 2004, they adopted a "Statement on Same Sex Marriage" which supported equality in marriage for both opposite-sex and same-sex couples throughout the U.S., and opposed the proposed Federal Marriage Amendment which would restrict marriage to opposite-sex couples.

Moderate reaction
In 1990, another schism occurred in which a large number of moderate congregations formed the Cooperative Baptist Fellowship (CBF), originally organized as a "convention within the convention" to support causes not controlled by the majority within the SBC.

Some CBF churches ordain both men and women as clergy, and support theological seminaries which directly sponsor and which support the moderate biblical interpretations of the CBF. As of 2018 there were approximately 1,800 churches affiliated with the Cooperative Baptist Fellowship. It was partnering with 15 theological schools, 19 autonomous state and regional organizations and more than 150 ministry organizations worldwide. Based in the Atlanta suburb of Decatur, Georgia, the CBF has an annual budget of $16 million.

State conventions react
Because each level of Baptist life is autonomous, changes at the national level do not require approval or endorsement by the state conventions or local associations. The majority of state conventions have continued to cooperate with the SBC. However, the state conventions in Texas and Virginia openly challenged the new directions and announced a "dual affiliation" with contributions to both the SBC's Cooperative Program and the CBF.

The Baptist General Convention of Texas (BGCT), the largest of the Southern Baptist state conventions, did not vote in 1998 to align itself with the CBF, despite some reports to the contrary. The BGCT did allow individual churches to designate their missions dollars to a number of different missions organizations, including the Southern Baptist Convention and the Cooperative Baptist Fellowship. One of the stated reasons for doing so was their objection to proposed changes in the 2000 revision of the Baptist Faith and Message, which the BGCT said made the document sound like a "creed" in violation of historic Baptist tradition which opposed their use.

In a reversal from the national convention (where the moderates left and the conservatives stayed), many Texas conservatives formed their own state convention, the Southern Baptists of Texas Convention. Local congregations either disassociated completely from BGCT or sought "dual alignment" with both groups. The BGCT remains the much larger of the two state conventions, and universities such as Baylor only receive money from the BGCT. Similarly, conservative Baptists in Virginia formed the Southern Baptist Conservatives of Virginia.

In Missouri, the exact opposite took place. The Missouri Baptist Convention (the existing state body) came under the control of the more conservative group which subsequently attempted to take over the boards of the state's agencies and institutions and reshape them along the theological lines of the current SBC. In 2002, some congregations withdrew and affiliated with a new convention called Baptist General Convention of Missouri. Five of the old Missouri Baptist Convention agencies changed their charters in 2000 and 2001 to elect their own trustees instead of allowing them to be appointed by the Missouri Baptist Convention. Leaders of the Missouri Baptist Convention saw this as a blatant violation of convention bylaws. When the trustees of the agencies refused to settle the matter out of court, the Missouri Baptist Convention filed suit against them. As of April, 2010, two of the agencies named have been released from lawsuit, and the other agencies have prevailed in court, although the judgments are being appealed. To date, in excess of $10 million in lawyers' fees and court costs have been expended by these lawsuits. To fund these lawsuits, the Missouri Baptist Convention mortgaged its headquarters building in Jefferson City, Missouri. Missouri Baptist University, Missouri Baptist Foundation, The Baptist Home and the Missouri Baptist Children's home all settled individually to be brought back under the control of the Missouri Baptist Convention.

The Virginia and Texas SBC Executive Committees receive and distribute funds from two conventions—one the traditional/original convention (BGAV and BGCT) and one new one that is only SBC (SBCVA and SBCTX). The Missouri SBC Executive Committee declined to receive money from the new more moderate Missouri group. They said it was not in Southern Baptists' best interest to cooperate with another group opposed to the conservative leadership of the Missouri Baptist Convention. Individual churches in the newer convention may contribute to the SBC directly.

Assessments
  Critics of the takeover faction assert that the "civil war" among Southern Baptists has been about power lust and right-wing secular politics. Russell H. Dilday, president of Southwestern Baptist Theological Seminary from 1978 to 1994, has analogized what he calls "the carnage of the past quarter century of denominational strife in our Baptist family" to "friendly fire" where casualties come as a result of the actions of fellow Baptists, not at the hands of the enemy. He writes that "Some of it has been accidental, " but that "some has been intentional." He characterizes the struggle as being "far more serious than a controversy, " but rather a "self-destructive, contentious, one-sided feud that at times took on combative characteristics."

Former president of the SBC Jimmy R. Allen writes that the resurgence/takeover leaders searched for a battle cry to which Baptists would respond. They found it in the fear that we were not "believing the Bible." They focused on the few who interpreted the Bible more liberally and exaggerated that fact. Allen's assessment is that "It was like hunting rabbits with howitzers. They destroyed more than they accomplished."

A spokesman for the new leadership of the SBC, Morris Chapman, claims that the root of the controversy has been about theology. He maintains that the controversy has "returned the Southern Baptist Convention to its historic commitments." Speaking as president of the "new" SBC's Executive Committee, Chapman cites as examples some of the Conservative Resurgency's claims:

 Baptist colleges and seminaries were producing more and more liberalism in writing, proclamation, and publication
 The adoption of a hermeneutic of suspicion which elevates human reason above the clear statements of the Bible
 The continued influence of many teachers and leaders who did not hold to a high view of Scripture.

While resurgence/takeover architect Paige Patterson believes the controversy has achieved its objective of returning the SBC from an alleged "leftward drift" to a more conservative stance, he admits to having some regrets. Patterson points to vocational disruption, hurt, sorrow, and disrupted friendships as evidence of the price that the controversy has exacted. "Friendships and sometimes family relationships have been marred. Churches have sometimes been damaged even though local church life has proceeded for the most part above the fray and often remains largely oblivious to it. No one seriously confessing the name of Jesus can rejoice in these sorrows", Patterson writes. "I confess that I often second guess my own actions and agonize over those who have suffered on both sides, including my own family."

See also
Christian Right
Fundamentalist–Modernist Controversy
Moral Majority
Seminex

Endnotes

Further reading

 Ammerman, Nancy Tatom. Baptist Battles: Social Change and Religious Conflict in the Southern Baptist Convention. New Brunswick: Rutgers University Press, 1990. (Sociological study of the controversy.)
 _. Southern Baptists Observed: Multiple Perspectives on a Changing Denomination. Knoxville: University of Tennessee Press, 1993. (Sociological study.)
 Barnhart, Joe Edward. The Southern Baptist Holy War. Austin: Texas Monthly Press, 1986.
 Basden, Paul A., ed. Has Our Theology Changed? Southern Baptist Thought Since 1845. Nashville: Broadman & Holman Publishers, 1994.
 Baugh, John G. The Battle For Baptist Integrity. Austin, Texas: Battle for Baptist Integrity, Inc., 1995. (Observations of a longtime, involved Southern Baptist layman.)
 Beale, David O. S.B.C.: House on the Sand. Greenville, S. C.: Unusual Publications, 1985.
 Bland, Thomas A., ed. Servant Songs. Macon, Ga.: Smyth & Helwys Publishing, Inc., 1994.
 Bush, L. Russ, and Tom J. Nettles. Baptists and the Bible. Chicago: Moody Press, 1980.
 Copeland, E. Luther. The Southern Baptist Convention and the Judgment of History: The Taint of an Original Sin. Lanharn, Maryland: University Press of America, 1995.
 Cothen, Grady C. What Happened to the Southern Baptist Convention? A Memoir of the Controversy. Macon, Georgia: Smyth & Helwys Publishing, Inc., 1993.
 _. The New SBC: Fundamentalism's Impact On The Southern Baptist Convention. Macon, Georgia: Smyth & Helwys Publishing, Inc., 1995.
 Davis, Jimmy Thomas. "Organizational Ideographs: A Case Study of the Recent Rise of Southern Baptist Fundamentalism." PhD diss. Bloomington: Indiana University, 1987.
 Durso, Pamela R. A Short History of the Cooperative Baptist Fellowship. Brentwood, Tennessee: Baptist History and Heritage Society, 2006.
 Elliott, Ralph H. The "Genesis Controversy" and Continuity in Southern Baptist Chaos. A Eulogy for a Great Tradition. Macon, Ga.: Mercer University Press, 1992.
 Farnsley, Arthur Emery, II. "Majority Rules: The Politicization of the Southern Baptist Convention." PhD diss. Atlanta: Emory University, 1990.
 _. Southern Baptist Politics: Authority and Power in the Restructuring of an American Denomination. University Park, Pa.: The Pennsylvania State University Press, 1994.
 Ferguson, Robert U. Amidst Babel, Speak Truth: Reflections on the Southern Baptist Struggle. Macon, Georgia: Smyth & Helwys Publishing, Inc., 1993. (Articles on various aspects of the controversy, written by a variety of moderate scholars.)
 Fletcher, Jesse C. The Southern Baptist Convention: A Sesquicentennial History. Nashville: Broadman & Holman Publishers, 1994.
 Garrett, James Leo, Jr. Are Southern Baptists "Evangelicals?" Macon, Ga.: Mercer University Press, 1983.
 Gourley, Bruce T. The GodMakers: A Legacy of the Southern Baptist Convention? Franklin, Tennessee: Providence House Publishers, 1996.
 Hankins, Barry. Uneasy in Babylon: Southern Baptist Conservatives and American Culture. Tuscaloosa: University of Alabama Press, 2003.
 Hefley, James C. The Truth in Crisis: The Controversy in the Southern Baptist Convention. Dallas: Criterion Publications, 1986.
 _. The Truth in Crisis: Bringing the Controversy UR-to-Date. Hannibal, Mo.: Hannibal Books, 1987.
 _. The Truth in Crisis: Conservative Resurgence or Political Takeover? Hannibal, Mo.: Hannibal Books, 1988.
 _. The Truth in Crisis: The 'State' of the Denomination. Hannibal, Mo.: Hannibal Books, 1989.
 _. The Truth in Crisis: The Winning Edge. Hannibal, Mo.: Hannibal Books, 1990.
 _. The Conservative Resurgence in the Southern Baptist Convention. Hannibal, Mo.: Hannibal Books, 1991.
 Humphreys, Fisher, editor. "The Controversy in the Southern Baptist Convention." A Special Issue of the Theological Educator. New Orleans: New Orleans Baptist Theological Seminary, 1985. (A compendium of articles and interviews by persons on differing sides of the conflict.)
 _, editor. "Polarities in the Southern Baptist Convention: " A Special Issue of the Theological Educator. New Orleans: New Orleans Baptist Theological Seminary, 1988. (Additional articles and interviews with major personalities on different sides of the controversy.)
 _. The Way We Were: How Southern Baptist Theology Has Changed and What It Means To Us All. Macon, Georgia: Smyth & Helwys Publishing, Inc., 2002.
 James, Gordon. Inerrancy and the Southern Baptist Convention. Dallas: Southern Heritage Press, 1986.
 James, Rob, and Gary Leazer. The Takeover in the Southern Baptist Convention. 8th edition. Decatur, Ga.: Baptists Today, 1994.
 James, Robison B., ed. The Unfettered Word Waco, Tx.: Word, Inc., 1987.
 _ and David S. Dockery, eds. Beyond the Impasse? Scripture. Interpretation and Theology in Baptist Life. Nashville: Broadman Press, 1992.
 Johnson, James Benson, II. "Academic Freedom and the Southeastern Baptist Theological Seminary Experience. 1979–1989." PhD diss. Williamsburg: The College of William and Mary, 1994.
 Kell, Carl L., editor. Exiled: Voices of the Southern Baptist Holy War. Knoxville: University of Tennessee Press, 2006.
 _ and L. Raymond Camp. In the Name of the Father: The Rhetoric of the New Southern Baptist Convention. Carbondale: Southern Illinois University Press, 1999.
 Kidd, Thomas S. and Barry Hankins. Baptists in America: A History. Oxford, England: Oxford University Press, 2015.
 Leonard, Bill J. God's Last and Only Hope: The Fragmentation of the Southern Baptist Convention. Grand Rapids, Michigan: Eerdmans Publishing Company, 1990.
 Lindsell, Harold. The Battle for the Bible. Grand Rapids: Zondervan Publishing House, 1976.
 McBeth, H. Leon. The Baptist Heritage. Nashville: Broadman, 1987.
 McNabb, Freddie, III. "Inerrancy and Beyond: The Controversy in the Southern Baptist Convention." MA thesis, University Southern Mississippi, 1991.
 May, Lynn E., editor. "The Southern Baptist Convention, 1979–1993: What Happened and Why?" Baptist History and Heritage 28 (October 1993). (Entire issue is devoted to the controversy, including essays from persons on both sides.)
 Merritt, John W. The Betrayal: The Hostile Takeover of the Southern Baptist Convention and a Missionary's Fight for Freedom in Christ. Asheville, North Carolina: R. Brent and Company, 2005. (The personal experiences and observations of a former Southern Baptist missionary.)
 Morgan, David T. The New Crusades, The New Holy Land: Conflict in the Southern Baptist Convention, 1968–1991. Tuscaloosa: University of Alabama Press, 1996. (Historical analysis; includes interviews with major players.)
 Neely, Alan, ed. Being Baptist Means Freedom. Charlotte, North Carolina: Southern Baptist Alliance, 1988.
 Nettles, Thomas I. By His Grace and for His Glory. Grand Rapids: Baker Book House, 1986.
 Noll, Mark A. The Scandal of the Evangelical Mind. Grand Rapids: Wm. B. Eerdmans Publishing Co., 1994.
 Parker, Gary E. Principles Worth Protecting. Macon, Ga.: Smyth & Helwys Publishing, Inc., 1993.
 Paschall, Henry Franklin. Identity Crisis in the Church: The Southern Baptist Convention Controversy. Nashville: Gospel Progress Inc., 1993.
 Patterson, Paige. The Proceedings of the Conference on Biblical Inerrancy 1987. Nashville: Broadman Press, 1987. Pool, Jeff D., ed. Sacred Mandates of Conscience: Interpretations of the Baptist Faith and Message. Macon, Ga.: Smyth & Helwys, 1997.
 _. Against Returning to Egypt: Exposing and Resisting Creedalism in the Southern Baptist Convention. Macon: Mercer University Press, 1998. (Analysis of the 1994 "Report of the Presidential Theological Study Committee.")
 Pressler, Paul. A Hill on Which to Die: One Southern Baptist's Journey. B&H Publishing Group, 2002. . (Pressler was an architect of the Takeover/Resurgence."Succinct, accurate portrayals of complex circumstances—a readable, journalistic summary that caught the flavor as well as the facts.")
 Robison, James B., editor. The Unfettered Word: Confronting the Authority–Inerrancy Question. Macon, Georgia: Smyth & Helwys Publishing, Inc., 1994. (Various articles on the issue of Biblical authority and Biblical inerrancy.)
 Rosenberg, Ellen M. The Southern Baptists: A Subculture in Transition. Knoxville: University of Tennessee Press, 1989. (Sociological study.)
 Shurden, Walter B. The Doctrine of the Priesthood of Believers. Nashville: Broadman Press, 1987.
 _. The Baptist Identity: Four Fragile Freedoms. Macon, Ga.: Smyth & Helwys Publishing, Inc., 1993.
 _. "The Struggle for the Soul of the SBC: Reflections and Interpretations." In The Struggle for the Soul of the SBC: Moderate Responses to the Fundamentalist Movement, edited by Walter B. Shurden, 275–90. Macon, Ga.: Mercer University Press, 1993.
 _. Not a Silent People: Controversies That Have Shaped Southern Baptists. updated edition. Macon, Ga.: Smyth & Helwys Publishing, Inc., 1995.
 _. Going for the Jugular: A Documentary History of the SBC Holy War. Macon, Ga.: Mercer University Press, 1996.
 _. ed. Proclaiming the Baptist Vision: The Bible. Macon, Ga.: Smyth and Helwys.
 _ and Randy Sheply, editors. Going for the Jugular: A Documentary History of the SBC Holy War. Macon, Georgia: Mercer University Press, 1996. (A chronology of the controversy, along with the publication of articles dealing with the events of the controversy as they occurred.)
 _, editor. The Struggle for the Soul of the SBC: Moderate Responses to the Fundamentalist Movement. Macon, Georgia: Mercer University Press, 1993. (Moderate leaders tell their stories about the moderate political response to the Fundamentalist TakeHover and the creation of new Baptist communities in the light of the Takeover's final victories.)
 _. Not a Silent People: Controversies that Have Shaped Southern Baptists. Macon, Georgia: Smyth & Helwys Publishing, Inc., 1995. (A historical overview of several disputes that have changed Baptist life, with the story of the Fundamentalist Takeover added at the end.)
 Smith, Oran P. The Rise of Baptist Republicanism. New York: New York University Press, 1997.
 Stone, William Stanley, Jr. "The Southern Baptist Convention Reformation. 1979- 1990: A Social Drama (Social Movement)." PhD diss. Baton Rouge: Louisiana State University, 1993.
 Sullivan, Clayton. Called to Preach Condemned to Survive. Macon, Ga.: Mercer University Press, 1985. Sullivan, James. Baptist Polity as I see It. Nashville: Broadman Press, 1983.
 Sutton, Jerry. The Baptist Reformation: The Conservative Resurgence in the Southern Baptist Convention. Broadman & Holman Publishers, 2000. . (Reexamines the twenty-year struggle "in gratitude to those who worked to bring about the Baptist Reformation.)
 Tuck, William Powell. Our Baptist Tradition. Macon, Ga.: Smyth & Helwys Publishing, 1993.
 Turner, Helen Lee. "Fundamentalism in the Southern Baptist Convention: The Crystallization of a Millenialist Vision." PhD diss. Charlottesville: University of Virginia, 1990.
 Wardin, Albert W. Baptist Around the World: A Comprehensive Handbook''. Nashville: Broadman & Holman Publishers, 1995.
 Whitlock, David. "Southern Baptists and Southern Culture: Three Visions of a Christian America." PhD diss. Louisville: Southern Baptist Theological Seminary, 1988.
 Wiles, Dennis Ray. "Factors Contributing to the Resurgence of Fundamentalism in the Southern Baptist Convention. 1979–1990." PhD diss. Ft. Worth: Southwestern Baptist Theological Seminary, 1992.

Southern Baptist Convention
Protestantism-related controversies
Conservatism in the United States